Laikipia University is a Kenyan University located in Nyahururu. It is a premier university of Education (Arts). It has 1 campus: Main Campus.

History
Laikipia University was founded in 1929 as a primary school by William Thomas Alfred Levet. Between 1965 and 1970, the institution served as a Large–Scale Farmers Training College (LSFTC). LSFTC was administered by the Ministry of Agriculture and Animal Husbandry. In October 1979, it was converted into an Animal Husbandry and Industry Training Institute (AHITI) offering a two-year course leading to a Certificate in Animal Health. In 1990, Laikipia University was established as a Campus of Egerton University.

This followed the recommendations of a Government Committee appointed to look into modalities of absorbing a double intake of students from Secondary Schools. It was meant to offer Education courses for graduate teacher-training.

It remained a campus of Egerton University between 1990 till 2010 majoring in BEd Arts and BA corses. In 2011, it became a constituent University College of Egerton University until 19 February 2013 when the then President of the Republic of Kenya, his Excellency Hon. Mwai Kibaki awarded Charter to make the institution a fully-fledged University.

Campuses

The Main Campus 

Laikipia University Main Campus is located 50 km from Nakuru town and 11 km from Nyahururu Town, along the Nakuru - Nyahururu Highway. It is situated in a serene environment which is conducive for learning. The Main Campus is the University nerve centre where most courses are offered and has the majority of students. The Main Campus has numerous facilities ranging from classrooms, laboratories, library, cyber cafe, bookshop, sports & games facilities, hostels for student accommodation, a health centre, restaurant, farm and Lake Chacha, among others.

Schools/Departments/Institutes
 School of Humanities and Developmental Studies
School of Science and Applied Technology
 School of Business and Economics
 School of Education
Graduate School

School of Sciences and Applied Technology
The School of Science and Applied Technology has five Departments namely:
 Department of Biological & Biomedical Sciences Technology
 Department of Chemistry and Biochemistry
 Department of Mathematics
 Department of Computing and Informatics
 Department of Earth Sciences

School of Humanities and Developmental Studies
The School of Humanities and Developmental Studies has two Departments namely:
 Literary and Communication Studies
 Public Affairs and Environmental Studies

School of Business and Economics
The School of Business and Economics has two Departments namely:
 Department of Commerce
 Department of Economics

School of Education
School of Education has two Departments namely:

 Psychology, Counselling and Educational Foundations
 Curriculum and Educational Management

References

External links

Laikipia University
Educational institutions established in 2013
2013 establishments in Kenya
Education in Rift Valley Province